Black Ridge is a prominent rock ridge in the Deep Freeze Range of Victoria Land,  long and rising to , forming a divide between Priestley Glacier and Corner Glacier. It was first explored by the Northern Party of the British Antarctic Expedition, 1910–13, and so named by them because of its appearance.

Further reading
 R. G. Adamson, Granitic rocks of the Campbell—Priestley divide, Northern Victoria Land, Antarctica,New Zealand Journal of Geology and Geophysics, 14:3, 486–503, DOI: 10.1080/00288306.1971.10421943
 PETER OBERHOLZER, CARLO BARONI, JOERG M. SCHAEFER, GIUSEPPE OROMBELLI, SUSAN IVY OCHS, PETER W. KUBIK, HEINRICH BAUR and RAINER WIELER, Limited Pliocene/Pleistocene glaciation in Deep Freeze Range ,northern Victoria Land, Antarctica, derived from in situcosmogenic nuclides, Antarctic Science 15 (4): 493–502 (2003) DOI: 10.1017/S0954102003001603

References 

Ridges of Victoria Land
Scott Coast